ENS El Fateh (971) is the lead ship of Egyptian Gowind-class corvette of the Egyptian Navy. She was commissioned on 22 September 2017.

Development and design 

The name El Fateh was originally first carried by the former British destroyer , acquired by the Egyptian Navy in 1955. The name was transferred to the new Gowind-class ship in September 2017, and the status of the former  Zenith is now unclear.

In 2014, Egypt signed a €1bn contract with Naval Group to buy four Gowind 2,500-ton corvettes with an option for two more. Separately, MBDA negotiated a contract to equip the ships with MICA vertical launch air-defense missiles and MM40 Block 3 Exocet anti-ship missiles, together worth an additional 400 million euros, while Naval Group negotiated a 100–200 million euro contract for torpedoes. Three of the corvettes are to be built locally by Alexandria Shipyardwithin a technology transfer agreement. It was apparently President Abdel Fattah el-Sisi who decided these were the ships he wanted rather than the Meko A200 being offered by German group ThyssenKrupp Marine Systems (TKMS) or the Sigma corvette proposed by Damen of the Netherlands. Egypt is in talks with France to acquire another two Gowind corvettes which, if ordered, would be produced by France in Lorient.

In April 2015, Naval Group started cutting metal for the very first Gowind 2500 corvette, with a planned construction period of 29 months. It is the first of a series of four units that will be delivered to Egypt before 2019. The corvette's first block was laid in the dry dock in September 2015. Naval Group celebrated the launch of the first Egyptian Gowind corvette El Fateh at the Lorient naval shipyard in September 2016. El Fateh successfully concluded its first sea trials by the end of March 2017. The Egyptian Navy took delivery of the vessel in September 2017, three years after the order was placed.

Construction and career 
El Fateh was laid down on 30 September 2015 and launched on 17 September 2016 by DCNS in Lorient. She was commissioned on 22 September 2017.

References 

2016 ships
Ships built in France